Ask.com (originally known as Ask Jeeves) is a question answering–focused e-business founded in 1996 by Garrett Gruener and David Warthen in Berkeley, California.

The original software was implemented by Gary Chevsky, from his own design. Warthen, Chevsky, Justin Grant, and others built the early AskJeeves.com website around that core engine. In 2006, the "Jeeves" name was dropped and they refocused on the search engine, which had its own algorithm. In late 2010, facing insurmountable competition from more popular search engines like Google, the company outsourced its web search technology and returned to its roots as a question and answer site. Douglas Leeds was elevated from president to CEO in 2010.

Three venture capital firms, Highland Capital Partners, Institutional Venture Partners, and The RODA Group were early investors. Ask.com is currently owned by InterActiveCorp (IAC) under the NASDAQ symbol , and its corporate headquarters are located at 555 City Center, in the Oakland City Center development in downtown Oakland, California.

History

Ask.com was originally known as Ask Jeeves, "Jeeves" being the name of a "gentleman's personal gentleman", or valet, fetching answers to any question asked. The character was named after Jeeves, Bertie Wooster's valet in the fictional works of P. G. Wodehouse.

The original idea behind Ask Jeeves was to allow users to get answers to questions in everyday, natural language, and traditional keyword searching. The current Ask.com still supports this for math, dictionary, and conversion questions.

Ask Jeeves launched in beta in mid-April 1997 and fully launched on June 1, 1997.

On September 18, 2001, Ask Jeeves acquired Teoma for over $1.5 million.

In July 2005, Ask Jeeves was acquired by IAC.

In February 2006, Jeeves was removed from Ask Jeeves and the search engine rebranded to Ask.

On May 16, 2006, Ask implemented a "Binoculars Site Preview" into its search results. On search results pages, the "binoculars" let searchers have a preview of the page they could visit with a mouse-over activating a pop-up screenshot.

On June 5, 2007, Ask.com relaunched with a 3D look.

In December 2007, Ask released the AskEraser feature, allowing users to opt-out from tracking of search queries and IP and cookie values. They also vowed to erase this data after 18 months if the AskEraser option is not set. HTTP cookies must be enabled for AskEraser to function.

On July 4, 2008, Ask acquired Lexico Publishing Group, which owns Dictionary.com, Thesaurus.com, and Reference.com.

In August 2008, Ask launched the Ask Kids search engine designed for children.

In April 2009, Jeeves returned to the UK version of Ask.com, redesigned as a CGI character and the website was once again named Ask Jeeves, though international versions were still just Ask.com. His image remained on the UK website until July 21, 2016, though the Ask Jeeves name would continue to be used until September 21, 2016, when the website rebranded to just Ask.

On July 26, 2010, Ask.com released a closed-beta Q&A service. The service was released to the public on July 29, 2010. Ask.com launched its mobile Q&A app for the iPhone in late 2010.

Ask.com reached 100 million global users per month in 2012 through its website with more than 2 million downloads of its flagship mobile app in that year. The company has also released additional apps spun out of its Q&A experience, including Ask Around in 2011 and PollRoll in 2012.

Search engine shut-down
In 2010, Ask.com abandoned the search industry, with the loss of 130 search engineering jobs, because it could not compete against more popular search engines such as Google. Earlier in the year, Ask had launched a Q&A community for generating answers from real people as opposed to search algorithms then combined this with its question-and–answer repository, utilizing its extensive history of archived query data to search sites that provide answers to questions people have.

To avoid a situation in which no answers were available from its own resources, the company outsourced to an unnamed third-party search provider the comprehensive web search matches that it had gathered itself.

Ask Sponsored Listings
Formerly the direct-sales engine for Ask.com, Ask Sponsored Listings is no longer available, having merged with Sendori, an operating business of IAC, in 2011.

Corporate details

Ask Jeeves, Inc. stock traded on the NASDAQ stock exchange from July 1999 to July 2005, under the ticker symbol ASKJ. In July 2005, the ASKJ ticker was retired upon the acquisition by IAC, valued at US$1.85 billion.

In 2012, Ask.com made two acquisitions as part of a larger strategy to offer more content on the Ask.com website. On July 2, 2012, Ask.com purchased content discovery start-up nRelate for an undisclosed amount. That was followed by the company's acquisition of expert advice and information site About.com, which closed in September 2012.

On August 14, 2014, Ask.com acquired popular social networking website ASKfm, where users can ask other users questions, with the option of anonymity. As of August 14, 2014, Ask.fm had 180 million monthly unique users in more than 150 countries around the world, with its largest user base in the United States. Available on the web and as a mobile app, ASKfm generates an estimated 20,000 questions per minute with approximately 45 percent of its mobile monthly active users logging in daily. , the mobile app has been downloaded more than 40 million times.

In 2021, Ask re-launched its SymptomFind brand and introduced the new finance-focused Ask Money site.

Marketing and promotion
Apostolos Gerasoulis, the co-creator of Ask's Teoma algorithmic search technology, starred in four television advertisements in 2007, extolling the virtues of Ask.com's usefulness for information relevance. A Jeeves balloon appeared in the Macy's Thanksgiving Day Parade through 2000–2004.

After a hiatus from mass consumer marketing, Ask returned to TV advertising in the fall of 2011 after refocusing its site on questions and answers. Instead of national advertising, Ask focused on local markets. In the summer of 2012, Ask launched a national cinema campaign, along with other out-of-home tactics in certain markets such as New York and Seattle.

As part of a Seattle-based local market effort, Ask.com launched its "You Asked We Answered" campaign in 2012, in which the company "answered" residents' top complaints about living in their city, including easing morning commutes and stadium traffic, as well as keeping the local Parks and Rec department wading pools open.

On January 14, 2009, Ask.com became the official sponsor of 2000 NASCAR Sprint Cup Series Champion Bobby Labonte's No. 96 Ford. Ask would become the official search engine of NASCAR. Ask.com was the primary sponsor for the No. 96 for 18 of the first 21 races and had rights to increase this to a total of 29 races that season. The Ask.com car debuted in the 2009 Bud Shootout where it failed to finish the race, but subsequently returned strongly, placing as high as 5th in a March 1, 2009, Shelby 427 race at Las Vegas Motor Speedway. Ask.com's foray into NASCAR represented the first instance of its venture into what it calls "Super Verticals".

References

External links
 

Companies based in Oakland, California
AskJeeves
Internet search engines
Desktop search engines
IAC (company)
Online companies of the United States
Internet properties established in 1996
Pay-per-click search engines
Question-and-answer websites
1999 initial public offerings
2005 mergers and acquisitions